In Plain Sight is a USA Network drama created by David Maples. Starring Mary McCormack, the series follows Mary Shannon, a Deputy United States Marshal who works at the Albuquerque, New Mexico office of the Federal Witness Security Program (WITSEC). The series premiered on Sunday, June 1, 2008, and aired its 61st and final episode on May 4, 2012.

Series overview

Episodes

Season 1 (2008)

Season 2 (2009)

Season 3 (2010) 
In Plain Sight's third-season premiere was Wednesday, March 31, 2010, on USA.  Lesley Ann Warren, Cristian de la Fuente, and Joshua Malina, appeared as recurring characters. Allison Janney joined the cast in a two-episode story arc as Allison Pearson, the new US Marshal Service regional director.

Originally slated for a 16-episode season, USA Network reduced In Plain Sight's episode order to 13 when executive producer and showrunner, John McNamara was forced to take a leave of absence for medical reasons.

Season 4 (2011)
In Plain Sight was renewed for a fourth and fifth season by USA Network on July 28, 2010.  The fourth season of thirteen episodes began on May 1, 2011. Rachel Boston joined the cast as Det. Abigail Chaffee, Marshall's new girlfriend, and Joshua Malina continued to portray Peter Alpert on a recurring basis. Additional guests included Bradley Whitford, John de Lancie, and Ali Marsh.  The season began production in January 2011, and continued until June 2011 in Albuquerque, New Mexico.  The season also saw the pregnancy of lead character Mary Shannon, to incorporate the real life pregnancy of star Mary McCormack.

Season 5 (2012)
In Plain Sight was renewed for its fourth and fifth seasons simultaneously on July 28, 2010. On August 11, 2011, USA confirmed that season five, with just eight episodes, would be its last. It premiered on March 16, 2012. Rachel Boston (Detective Abigail Chaffee) continues, now as a main cast member; Lesley Ann Warren (Jinx Shannon) and Tangie Ambrose (Delia Parmalee) returned as recurring guest stars, while Nichole Hiltz (Brandi Shannon) is expected to return as well. Ali Marsh made multiple appearances as Dr. Shelly Finkel, a psychiatrist working with the inspectors. Bryan Callen returned to the series in multiple episodes as Mark Stuber, the father of Mary's daughter; Mimi Kennedy appeared in several episodes as Mark's mother, Joanna Stuber. The second episode featured Mädchen Amick as Lisa Ruffino, WITSEC's second-in-command who informs Stan that the Albuquerque division of WITSEC will be shut down.  Tia Carrere appeared in several episodes as Lia Hernandez, Stan's dance instructor, and later, a love interest. Stephen Lang appeared in multiple episodes as Mary and Brandi's father, James Wiley Shannon. Josh Hopkins appeared in two episodes as Kenny, another single parent who is a potential love interest for Mary. Cristián de la Fuente reprised his role as Raphael Ramirez in one episode, while Vanessa Evigan appeared as his new wife. Aaron Ashmore and Will McCormack returned in the sixth episode as Scott Griffin and Special Agent Robert O'Connor, respectively. It was announced via Twitter that Geoff Pierson would return to the series as Seth Mann, Marshall's father, who visits Albuquerque to speak with Marshall about Abigail; this appearance also came in the sixth episode.

References 

General references

External links 
 

Episodes
Lists of American drama television series episodes